Craig Connell is a Grand Prix motorcycle racer from Australia.

Career statistics

By season

References

External links
 Profile on motogp.com

Australian motorcycle racers
Living people
1968 births
250cc World Championship riders
500cc World Championship riders
Superbike World Championship riders